Sri Narapura Venkateswara Temple is an ancient Hindu-Vaishnavite temple situated in Jammalamadugu, YSR Kadapa District, Andhra Pradesh India. The temple is dedicated to Lord Venkateswara, an incarnation of Vishnu, who is referred to as Narapura Venkateswara.

Administration
The temple, at present is being administered by Tirumala Tirupati Devasthanams.

Festivals
Annual Brahmotsavams will be held for nine days in the month Vaisakha, which falls in the month of May.

See also
List of temples under Tirumala Tirupati Devasthanams

References

External links
 

    

Vishnu temples
Hindu temples in Kadapa district
Tirumala Tirupati Devasthanams